The 2002–03 season was the 88th season of the Isthmian League, which is an English football competition featuring semi-professional and amateur clubs from London, East and South East England.

Premier Division

The Premier Division consisted of 24 clubs, including 20 clubs from the previous season and four new clubs:
 Aylesbury United, promoted as third in Division One
 Bishop's Stortford, promoted as runners-up in Division One
 Ford United, promoted as champions of Division One
 Hayes, relegated from the Football Conference

Aldershot Town won the division and were promoted to the Football Conference ten years after Aldershot bankruptcy. Canvey Island finished second for the third time in a row. Four teams finished bottom of the table relegated to divisions One.

At the end of the season Purfleet was renamed Thurrock.

League table

Stadia and locations

Division One North

At the end of the previous season Division One was replaced by divisions One North and South. Subsequently, Division Three clubs were distributed between divisions One and Two.

Division One North consisted of 24 clubs, including nine clubs from the Division One, eleven clubs promoted from the Division Two and four clubs promoted from the Division Three.

Northwood won the division and were promoted to the Premier Division along with runners-up Hornchurch, who promoted from Division Three to the Premier Division in two seasons. Wembley and Hertford Town finished bottom of the table and relegated to Division Two.

At the end of the season Leyton Pennant were renamed Waltham Forest.

League table

Stadia and locations

Division One South

At the end of the previous season Division One was replaced by divisions One North and South. Subsequently, Division Three clubs were distributed between divisions One and Two.

Division One South consisted of 24 clubs, including ten clubs from the Division One, eight clubs promoted from the Division Two, five clubs promoted from the Division Three, and one club relegated from Premier Division.

Carshalton Athletic won the division and were promoted to the Premier Division along with runners-up Bognor Regis Town, who promoted from Division Three to the Premier Division in two seasons. Chertsey Town finished bottom of the table and relegated to Division Two.

League table

Stadia and locations

Division Two

At the end of the previous season most of the Division Two clubs were transferred to the newly created divisions One. Division Two consisted of 16 clubs, including two clubs from the previous season, 13 clubs promoted from the Division Three and Leyton promoted as champions of the Essex Senior League.

League table

Stadia and locations

See also
Isthmian League
2002–03 Northern Premier League
2002–03 Southern Football League

References

External links
Official website

Isthmian League seasons
6